Adam El Hagar is an actor. He studied drama at East 15 Acting School.

Career 

After graduating from drama school he appeared as Ollie in the second series of Peaky Blinders (TV series).

From 2015 to 2016 he had a recurring role as Siddiq in FX (TV channel)'s Tyrant (TV series).

Between 2014 and 2016, he co-created and performed in the stage musical Licensed To Ill based on the life and music of the Beastie Boys. It was performed at the Camden People's Theatre. and the Southwark Playhouse in London. The show was nominated for three Offies including: Best new musical, Best sound design and Best ensemble. Alongside his co-creators, he won a Theatre & Technology award for Creative Innovation in Sound for the show.

In 2019 he appeared as Valerian Zubov in HBO's  Catherine the Great (miniseries). He also appeared in AMC (TV channel)'s Soulmates (TV series).

He played the male lead in British independent film 'Amaryllis', directed by Tom Lawes which was released in 2022.

He is due to appear in Alfonso Cuarón's upcoming thriller Disclaimer (TV series).

Filmography

Television

Film

References

External links 

 Adam El Hagar at IMDb

21st-century male actors